Antoine Matthieu Le Carpentier (15 July 1709 - 1773) was a French architect.

Biography
Antoine Matthieu Le Carpentier was born in Rouen, the son of a carpenter.

He became a member of the Académie royale d'architecture in 1756. His students included the brothers Joseph-Abel and Guillaume-Martin Couture, Jean-Baptiste Louis Élisabeth Le Boursier and Jean-Benoît-Vincent Barré.

He died in Paris in 1773.

Works
His works include the rebuilding of the Château de la Ferté-Vidame (1771).

1709 births
1773 deaths
Architects from Rouen
18th-century French architects
Members of the Académie royale d'architecture